Strongylogaster is a genus of insects belonging to the family Tenthredinidae.

Species:
 Strongylogaster cretensis
 Strongylogaster empriaeformis
 Strongylogaster filicis

References

Tenthredinidae
Sawfly genera